The African hoopoe (Upupa africana) is a species of hoopoe in the family Upupidae. Previously considered as a subspecies (Upupa epops africana) of the Eurasian hoopoe, it is a resident species of southern Africa.

Taxonomy 
The African hoopoe was formally described in 1811 by the German naturalist Johann Matthäus Bechstein under the present binomial name Upupa africana. It is now sometimes treated as a subspecies of the Eurasian hoopoe (Upupa epops). The species is monotypic: no subspecies are recognised.

Description 
The weight is between 38 and 67 g when fully grown. This is about the size of the average American robin. African hoopoes have a crest which is chestnut coloured with black on the tips. It is raised when the bird has been startled or disturbed, especially when eating. No eyerings or eye-stripes are present, but the bill is long, dark and narrow and slightly down curved. The male is typically fully chestnut colored, whereas the female has a grayer body. Both males and females have black and white stripes on their wings and tail which are rounded. This black and white striped pattern leads to a V-formation on their backs. Juveniles are similar in appearance to females except that they have a shorter beak. In adults, the beak is about the same size as the head.

When these birds are in flight, they flap between 4 and 5 beats, then pause in which their body drops, and then continue to beat their wings 4 to 5 times. When in the air, you'll notice the same black and white striping on the wings and tail on their underside as when they are perched.

The African hoopoe differs from the Eurasian hoopoe in having plumage which is deep rufous rather than pale sandy buff.

Vocalization 
The African hoopoes most common call is very distinctive "oop-oop" or "oop-oop-oop". This will be repeated after a pause. This call is only made by males and is usually used during the mating season. Besides the "oop" call, the male will also produce a “swizzling” sound: “swizzle-swizzle-swizzle”.  When not in mating season, these birds are more silent but still have some sounds such as the “rattle” and “huk”. These sounds are used more often when the bird has been disturbed and is used by both the males and females. Lastly, a sound: "choorie, choorie, choorie" is used by males when he gives food to the female during the mating season.

Distribution and habitat
The African hoopoe is widely distributed throughout southern Africa from Central Democratic Republic of Congo across to central Kenya and all the way south to the Cape of Good Hope. A list of countries where the African hoopoe is commonly seen is as follows: South Africa, Lesotho, Eswatini, Namibia, Botswana, Zimbabwe, Mozambique, Angola, Zambia, Malawi, Tanzania, Kenya and the southern half of the Democratic Republic of the Congo. Unlike the Eurasian hoopoe that often migrates, the African hoopoe is usually resident but may make short-distance movements.

The species prefers open and bushy areas, including thornveld, a landscape with mostly thorny bush and trees, and riverine woodlands in dry areas. It inhabits broadleaf forests and savannah.

Behaviour 
Only a limited amount of research has been carried out on the African hoopoe, but it appears to be similar in behaviour to the Eurasian hoopoe, although it occupies a different ecological niche. The biggest threat predatorily are raptor species which include hawks and eagles.

Food and feeding 
African hoopoes eat mainly insects. These include Coleoptera, which are beetles, Dermaptera (earwigs) and Orthoptera, grasshoppers, locusts and crickets. Besides these, small reptiles have been found to be fed to chicks as well as worms, slugs, and small snakes. Small seeds and berries may even be eaten. To find the insects, the African Hoopoe uses its long beak to penetrate the soil and then may whack the insect or prey onto the ground to break it up into smaller pieces. They prefer to do this in shorter grass. Unlike the rest of the year, African hoopoes maintain a specific territory throughout the breeding season in which they feed.

Breeding 
The African hoopoa bird is monogamous. The mating season begins in mid April where the male seeks out a female and offers her small pieces of food. Breeding occurs later in August. The African hoopoe does not make its own nest but rather finds a nest hole that is just slightly larger than its body. The nest hole is probably chosen by the male. The nests are located from ground level up to a maximum of about eight meters above the ground. The clutch varies between four and seven eggs which are laid at one or two day intervals. The eggs are smooth and blue-green when freshly laid but with age they become rougher and the colour fades. Only the female incubates the eggs which hatch after 14 and 16 days. The chicks are fed mostly by the male until close to their fledging date when the female and male share the responsibilities. The chicks fledge after between 26 and 32 days. These birds are double brooded and have two sets of chicks per year. The breeding season ends in December. The greater honeyguide may use the nests of African hoopoes to lay their own eggs making them brood parasites.

References

External links 
 Distribution of African Hoopoe
 Hoopoe IUCN page

Upupa
Birds described in 1811